Articles of partnership is a voluntary contract between/among two or more persons to place their capital, labor, and skills into a business, with the understanding that there will be a sharing of the profits and losses between/among partners.  Outside of North America, it is normally referred to simply as a partnership agreement.

A partnership agreement is a written and legal agreement between/among business partners. It is always recommended but not essential for partners to have such an agreement.

Articles of partnership

Multiple sections are often included in articles of partnership, based on the circumstances:
 the granting of the partner the rights to manage and administer the business or a specific department.
 the authorization of a majority of partners to manage the affairs of the entire partnership. This is particularly common where there are numerous partners.
 provisions to account for, annually, the property and debts of the business.
 the forbidding of any partner to carry out business unrelated to the partnership. This is usually implied in articles of partnership.
 the allowance of expelling partners who commit gross misconduct or become insolvent, bankrupt, etc. This is particularly common where there are numerous partners.
 the submission of arguments to arbitration.
 the allocation of business income and losses among partners.

See also
 General partnership

References

Business law
Legal documents
Partnerships